Falsomoechotypa kaszabi is a species of beetle in the family Cerambycidae, and the only species in the genus Falsomoechotypa. It was described by Breuning in 1954.

References

Apomecynini
Beetles described in 1954
Monotypic Cerambycidae genera